Lick Branch is a  long 2nd order tributary to Lanes Creek in Union County, North Carolina.

Course
Lick Branch rises in a pond on the southwest side of Marshville, North Carolina in Union County.  Lick Branch then flows east to meet Lanes Creek about 2 miles southeast of Marshville.

Watershed
Lick Branch drains  of area, receives about 48.2 in/year of precipitation, has a topographic wetness index of 442.68 and is about 31% forested.

References

Rivers of North Carolina
Rivers of Union County, North Carolina
Tributaries of the Pee Dee River